Edward Street is a busy thoroughfare in the Brisbane central business district, Queensland, Australia.  It is a one-way street located between Albert Street and Creek Street, and runs from Upper Edward Street to Alice Street. It is named after Edward VII of the United Kingdom.

A number of prominent Brisbane landmarks are situated on Edward Street. The Central Station, the Queen Street Mall, the Metro Arts Theatre and the City Botanic Gardens can be accessed from Edward Street.

A number of Brisbane CBD shopping centres have entrances from Edward Street. These include QueensPlaza, Wintergarden, MacArthur Central, ANZAC Square Arcade and Rowes Arcade.

History 
In 1866 a Baptist Church opened in Edward Street.

Heritage listings

There are a number of heritage-listed sites in Edward Street, including:
 2 Edward Street: Old Mineral House
 3 Edward Street: former Naval Offices
 32 Edward Street: Smellie's Building
 39 Edward Street: former Port Office
 40 Edward Street: Port Office Hotel
 41 Edward Street: South East Queensland Water Board Building
 47–51 Edward Street: Spencers Building
 93–103 Edward Street: Youngs Building
 104 Edward Street: former Henry Box & Son – Coachbuilders Building
 109–117 Edward Street: Metro Arts Theatre
 127 Edward Street: Victory Hotel
 131 Edward Street: The Exchange Hotel (also known as Stock Exchange Hotel)
 149 Edward Street: Catholic Centre
 166 Edward Street: Pioneer House
 172 Edward Street: Invicta House
 178 Edward Street: Embassy Hotel
 206 Edward Street: Tattersalls Club
 235 Edward Street: Rowes Building
 237 Edward Street: Rothwells Building
 308 Edward Street: People's Palace
 Edward Street: City Electric & Light (CEL) Company Manhole Cover

Cafes of Edward Street 
The Shingle Inn at 254 Edward Street was a listed heritage café. When the building was demolished in 2002 to make way for the QueensPlaza shopping mall, the café's fittings were removed and stored. In 2013, the café was re-established using the original fittings within Brisbane City Hall.

A number of Greek owned and run cafes also featured in Edward Street during the twentieth century. Ellisos Cafe, owned by Con Tsiros ran from 1914-1923. Next door to this cafe Tsiros also opened The Garden of Roses Cafe at 242 Edward Street which ran from 1915-1928 and later The Continental Cafe. They served a clientele who enjoyed the 7am-11pm opening hours. The Garden of Roses Cafe featured German and French chefs, and offered a European range of delicacies The artist Lloyd Rees reflected on the special favour it was to visit The Garden of Roses Cafe in his autobiography. Many of the stores featured Art Deco finishes.

Luxury shopping
Edward Street is the central avenue in Brisbane's upmarket shopping district. Many national and international fashion, jewellery and homewares stores have boutiques on Edward Street.

History of Edward Street shopping

Edward Street is home to Brisbane's luxury fashion and jewellery brands, with many shopping centres having high-end precincts that front onto Edward St, as well as stand-alone stores. QueensPlaza's Edward Street frontage has the likes of Louis Vuitton, Chanel, Salvatore Ferragamo, Tiffany & Co., Paspaley and Burberry. MacArthur Central has Ralph Lauren, Oroton, Rhodes & Beckett and Tag Heuer. Other brands have boutiques located further down towards the Botanic Gardens.

In April 2011, it was announced that the former Dymocks store in the heritage listed MacArthur Chambers would be redeveloped into an Apple Store. The proposal was approved by the Brisbane City Council in May 2011, with the store opening in January 2014.

The stretch between Queen Street and Elizabeth Street holds other well known luxury brands, with super-luxury Australian jeweller Canturi having his only Brisbane salon in the Tattersalls Arcade, opposite French leather making Longchamp. Also in this stretch are Gucci and Australian luxury handbag maker Oroton, which re-opened their flagship Brisbane store in late 2012.

The corner of Edward Street and Elizabeth Street is particularly prestigious. Hermes operate a two-storey flagship on the corner of Edward St and Elizabeth St, diagonally opposite Omega, will open a flagship in late 2018 at this intersection. Tag Heuer also operate a store on that corner, while Cartier operate its largest Australian store on the remaining corner spot, taking two levels of a heritage building.

In late July 2012 Mont Blanc opened their new boutique next to Hermes, after closing their Queens Plaza store.  In December 2012, Singapore-based luxury timepiece retailer The Hour Glass opened their fourth Australian store on Edward Street, next to Mont Blanc. In April 2013 Ermenegildo Zegna opened a two-storey boutique on the street. Other stores in the vicinity include Italian menswear specialist Canali, Brisbane-based menswear department store Mitchell Ogilvie, and Australian menswear specialist The Cloakroom.

Major intersections

 Alice Street
 Margaret Street
 Mary Street
 Charlotte Street
 Elizabeth Street
 Queen Street
 Adelaide Street
 Ann Street
 Turbot Street
 Wickham Terrace

See also

144 Edward Street, Brisbane

References

External links
 Edward Street Location

External links

 
Streets in Brisbane
Brisbane central business district